Finis Ernest Branham (April 7, 1900 – January 19, 1957), nicknamed "Slim", was an American Negro league pitcher between 1920 and 1932.

A native of Castalian Springs, Tennessee, Branham made his Negro leagues debut in 1920 with the Dayton Marcos. He went on to play for several teams, and finished his career in 1932 with the New York Black Yankees. Branham died in Cleveland, Ohio in 1957 at age 56.

References

External links
 and Baseball-Reference Black Baseball stats and Seamheads

1900 births
1957 deaths
Chicago American Giants players
Cleveland Elites players
Cleveland Hornets players
Cleveland Tate Stars players
Dayton Marcos players
Detroit Stars players
Harrisburg Giants players
Homestead Grays players
Indianapolis ABCs (1931–1933) players
New York Black Yankees players
St. Louis Stars (baseball) players
20th-century African-American sportspeople
Baseball pitchers